Pan Samochodzik (Polish for 'Mister Automobile', also known as Tomasz N.N.) is a fictional art historian, journalist, renowned adventurer and historical detective created by Polish writer Zbigniew Nienacki. He is a main character in a series of adventures centering on historical mysteries and treasures. As a museum and government employee, Pan Samochodzik not only has to discover treasures, but protect them from thieves. His nickname comes from his fantastic (heavily customized) automobile.

Characters

Pan Samochodzik
Pan Samochodzik, a.k.a. Tomasz N.N., is an employee of the fictional Department of Artifact Protection in the Polish Ministry of Culture and Art. He is a special envoy with extensive knowledge in the areas of history, riddle-solving, finding treasures and protecting them from thieves. As such, he is sometimes called a Polish version of Robert Langdon, Dirk Pitt or Indiana Jones.

His nickname, Pan Samochodzik (Polish for 'Mr. Automobile'; French (this version also appeared in one of the books): 'Monsieur La Bangnolette'), comes from his unique vehicle: a heavily modified by his uncle Ferrari 410 SuperAmerica (a wreck after a serious car crash on the way to Zakopane; the only thing that remained functional was the engine—Mr Automobile's uncle bought it and installed in his self-constructed vehicle). The car can reach a very high speed and is capable of traversing water and difficult terrain. Many people perceived this vehicle as ugly because of its dubledore-like design.

His other name, Tomasz N.N., comes from the author's real name, Zbigniew Tomasz Nowicki, the second "N" representing his adopted surname, Nienacki.

Allies
Pan Samochodzik is sometimes accompanied by youngsters—often Polish Boy Scouts.

Novels written by authors other than Nienacki also feature Paweł Daniec, a young art historian, ex-commando and sidekick of Samochodzik.

Villains
Pan Samochodzik's nemesis is Waldemar Batura, former art historian, smuggler and thief.

Novels written by authors other than Nienacki feature Jerzy Batura, new villain, son and successor of Waldemar.

Novels

Original Nienacki novels
Note:  The dates of the following novels may be inaccurate, as some of them may have been published in a different order than they were written.

In the first three novels (and ), Pan Samochodzik is a journalist, not a government employee. In the 1990s, Nienacki rewrote those three books so they would be consistent with the series. The books were released by various publishers, and it was not until 1987 that a single publisher (Pojezierze) decided to rerelease the series with one graphic design.

  — Permit for the transport of a lion (new title:  — First Adventure of Pan Samochodzik) (1961) 
  — The Treasure of Athanaric (new title:  — Pan Samochodzik and the Treasure of Athanaric) (1960) 
  — Sacred place (new title:  — Pan Samochodzik and the Holy Reliquary) (1957) 
  — The Island of Villains (new title:  — Pan Samochodzik and the Island of Villains) (1964) 
  — Pan Samochodzik and the Knights Templar (1966) 
  — Unearthly Mansion (new title:  — Pan Samochodzik and the Unearthly Mansion) (1970) 
  — New Adventures of Pan Samochodzik (new title:  — Pan Samochodzik and Captain Nemo) (1970) 
  — Pan Samochodzik and Fantômas (1973) 
  — Pan Samochodzik and the Riddles of Frombork (1972) 
  — The Book of Fear (new title:  — Pan Samochodzik and Strange Checkerboards) (1967) 
  — Pan Samochodzik and the Secret of Secrets (1975) 
  — Pan Samochodzik and Winnetou (1976) 
  — Pan Samochodzik and the Invisible (1977) 
  — Pan Samochodzik and the Golden Gauntlet (1979) 
  — Pan Samochodzik and the Man from UFO (new title:  — Pan Samochodzik and the Immortal) (1985)

Nienacki novels completed by Jerzy Ignaciuk

  (1997) (Only partially written, completed by Jerzy Ignaciuk) 
  (1997) (re-written by Jerzy Ignaciuk, originally unconnected with the Pan Samochodzik series and named )

Novels by other authors
After Nienacki's death in 1994, his publishers (Warmia) received permission from his estate to continue the series. The new novels take place in post-communist Poland, introduce two new main characters (sidekick Paweł Daniec and villain Jerzy Batura), and in the newest book, replace the old vehicle with a new, Jeep-based variant.

 (17)  by Jerzy Szumski (1997)
 (18)  (2 parts), by Jerzy Szumski (1998)
 (19)  (2 parts) by Jerzy Szumski (1999)
 (20)  by Andrzej Pilipiuk (under the pen name Tomasz Olszakowski) (1999)
 (21)  by Andrzej Pilipiuk (under the pen name Tomasz Olszakowski) (1999)
 (22)  by Sebastian Miernicki (1999)
 (23)  by Jerzy Szumski (2000)
 (24)  by Andrzej Pilipiuk (under the pen name Tomasz Olszakowski) (2000)
 (25)  (2 parts) by Arkadiusz Niemirski (2000)
 (26)  by Tomasz Olszakowski (2000)
 (27)  (2 parts) by Sebastian Miernicki (2000)
 (28)  by Andrzej Pilipiuk (under the pen name Tomasz Olszakowski) (2001)
 (29)  by Sebastian Miernicki (2001)
 (30)  (2 parts) by Arkadiusz Niemirski (2001)
 (31)  by Andrzej Pilipiuk (under the pen name Tomasz Olszakowski) (2001)
 (32)  by Sebastian Miernicki (2001)
 (33)  by Andrzej Pilipiuk (under the pen name Tomasz Olszakowski) (2001)
 (34) , by Arkadiusz Niemirski (2002)
 (35)  by Arkadiusz Niemirski (2002)
 (36)  by Andrzej Pilipiuk (under the pen name Tomasz Olszakowski) (2002)
 (37)  by Sebastian Miernicki (2002)
 (38)  by Arkadiusz Niemirski (2002)
 (39)  by Andrzej Pilipiuk (under the pen name Tomasz Olszakowski) (2002)
 (40)  by Andrzej Pilipiuk (under the pen name Tomasz Olszakowski) (2002)
 (41)  by Sebastian Miernicki, (2002)
 (42)  by Andrzej Pilipiuk (under the pen name Tomasz Olszakowski) (2002)
 (43)  by Sebastian Miernicki (2002)
 (44)  by Andrzej Pilipiuk (under the pen name Tomasz Olszakowski) (2002)
 (45)  by Arkadiusz Niemirski (2002)
 (46)  by Sebastian Miernicki (2002)
 (47)  by Andrzej Pilipiuk (under the pen name Tomasz Olszakowski) (2003)
 (48)  by Arkadiusz Niemirski (2003)
 (49)  by Sebastian Miernicki (2003)
 (50)  by Andrzej Pilipiuk (under the pen name Tomasz Olszakowski) (2003)
 (51)  by Arkadiusz Niemirski (2003)
 (52)  by Sebastian Miernicki (2003)
 (53)  by Sebastian Miernicki (2003)
 (54)  by Arkadiusz Niemirski (2003)
 (55)  by Sebastian Miernicki (2003)
 (56)  by Andrzej Pilipiuk (under the pen name Tomasz Olszakowski) (2003)
 (57)  by Arkadiusz Niemirski (2003)
 (58)  by Jacek Mróz (2003)
 (59)  by Józef Burny (2003)
 (60)  by Sebastian Miernicki (2003)
 (61)  by Arkadiusz Niemirski (2004)
 (62)  by Sebastian Miernicki (2004)
 (63)  by Andrzej Pilipiuk (under the pen name Tomasz Olszakowski) (2004)
 (64)  by Andrzej Pilipiuk (under the pen name Tomasz Olszakowski) (2004)
 (65)  by Sebastian Miernicki (2004)
 (66)  by Arkadiusz Niemirski (2004)
 (67)  by Sebastian Miernicki (2004)
 (68)  by Andrzej Pilipiuk (under the pen name Tomasz Olszakowski) (2004)
 (69)  by Józef Burny (2004)
 (70)  by Jacek Mróz (2005)
 (71)  by Arkadiusz Niemirski (2005)
 (72)  by Sebastian Miernicki (2005)
 (73)  by Sebastian Miernicki (2005)
 (74)  by Krzysztof Zagórski (2005)
 (75)  by Arkadiusz Niemirski (2005)
 (76)  by Iga Karst (2005)
 (77)  by Andrzej Pilipiuk (under the pen name Tomasz Olszakowski) (2005)
 (78)  by Sebastian Miernicki (2005)
 (79)  by Sebastian Miernicki (2005)
 (80)  by Arkadiusz Niemirski (2006)
 (81)  by Sebastian Miernicki (2006)
 (82)  by Arkadiusz Niemirski (2006)
 (83)  by Sebastian Miernicki (2006)
 (84)  by Krzysztof Zagórski (2006)
 (85)  by Sebastian Miernicki (2006)
 (86)  by Iga Karst (2007)
 (87)  by Maciek Horn (2007)
 (88)  by Jakub Czarny (2007)
 (89)  by Sebastian Miernicki (2007)
 (90)  by Sebastian Miernicki (2007)
 (91)  by Sebastian Miernicki (2007)
 (92)  by Jakub Czarny (2007)
 (93)  by Jakub Czarny (2007)
 (94)  by Jakub Czarny (2008)
 (95)  by Iga Karst (2008)
 (96)  by Marek Żelech (2008)
 (97)  by Jakub Czarny (2009)
 (98)  by Jakub Czarny (2009)
(99)  by Marek Żelech (2009)
(100)  by Sebastian Miernicki (2009)
(101)  by Jakub Czarnik (2009)
(102)  by Jakub Czarnik (2009)
(103)  by Jakub Czarnik (2010)
(104)  by Jakub Czarnik (2010)
(105)  by Jakub Czarnik (2011)
(106)  by Jakub Czarnik (2011)
(107)  by Marek Żelech (2011)
(108)  by Marek Żelech (2012)
(109)  by Marek Żelech (2012)
(110)  by Andrzej Irski (2012)
(111)  by Marek Żelech (2013)
(112)  by Andrzej Irski (2013)
(113)  by Andrzej Irski (2013)
(114)  by Andrzej Irski (2013)
(115)  by Paweł Wiliński (2013)
(116)  by Paweł Wiliński (2013)
(117)  by Marek Żelech (2013)
(118)  by Andrzej Irski (2014)
(119)  by Luiza Frosz (2014)
(120)  by Paweł Wiliński (2014)
(121)  by Konrad Kuśmirak (2014)
(122)  by Kamil Kozakowski (2014)
(123)  by Amos Oskar Ajchel (2014)
(124)  by Andrzej Irski (2014)
(125)  by Paweł Wiliński (2014)
(126)  by Marek Żelech (2014)
(127)  by Andrzej Irski (2014)
(128)  by Paweł Wiliński (2015)
(129)  by Bartłomiej Giziński (2015)
(130)  by Andrzej Irski (2015)
(131)  by Paweł Wiliński (2015)
(132)  by Luiza Frosz (2015)
(133)  by Bartłomiej Giziński (2015)
(134)  by Andrzej Irski (2015)
(135)  by Bartłomiej Giziński (2016)
(136)  by Paweł Wiliński (2016)
(137)  by Andrzej Irski (2016)
(138)  by Paweł Wiliński (2016)
(139)  by Andrzej Irski (2016)
(140)  by Andrzej Irski (2016)
(141)  by Marek Żelech (2017)
(142)  by Luiza Frosz (2017)
(143)  by Andrzej Irski (2017)
(144)  by Paweł Wiliński (2017)
(145)  by Andrzej Irski (2017)
(146)  by Andrzej Irski (2017)
(147)  by Andrzej Irski (2017)
(148)  by Andrzej Irski (2018)
(149)  by Łukasz Supel (2018)
(150)  by Marek Żelech (2018)
(151)  by Andrzej Irski (2019)
(152)  by Marek Żelech (2019)
(153)  by Łukasz Supel (2019)
(154)  by Andrzej Irski (2020)
(155)  by Grzegorz Szmatuła (2020)
(156)  by Marek Żelech (2020)
(157)  by Łukasz Supel (2020)
(158)  by Stefan Kot (2021)
(159)  by Maciej Burski-Walden (2021)

Pan Samochodzik in other media

Film
  (1965, directed by Stanisław Jędryka), based on 
  (1986, directed by Janusz Kidawa), based on 
  (1988, directed by Kazimierz Tarnas), based on 
  (1991, directed by Janusz Kidawa), based on

Television
  (1971, five-episode miniseries directed by Hubert Drapella), based on

Crossovers

Pan Samochodzik has crossovers with Jakub Wędrowycz and the protagonists of the Kuzynki series, both written by Andrzej Pilipiuk.

Pan Samochodzik series writers

 Zbigniew Nienacki—17 novels
 Sebastian Miernicki (Sebastian Mierzyński)—27 novels
 Tomasz Olszakowski (Andrzej Pilipiuk)—19 novels
 Andrzej Irski (Ireneusz Sewastianowicz)—19 novels
 Arkadiusz Niemirski—16 novels
 Jakub Czarny (Jakub Czarny)—12 novels
 Marek Żelech (Marek Żelkowski)—12 novels
 Paweł Wiliński—9 novels
 Jerzy Szumski (Jerzy Ignaciuk)—4 novels
 Luiza Frosz—3 novels
 Bartłomiej Giziński—3 novels
 Iga Karst—3 novels
 Łukasz Supel—3 novels
 Józef Burny (Józef Burniewicz)—2 novels
 Maciej Burski-Walden—1 novel
 Jacek Mróz (Józef Jacek Rojek)—2 novels
 Krzysztof Zagórski—2 novels
 Amos Oskar Ajchel—1 novel
 Maciek Horn (Maciej Książek)—1 novel
 Stefan Kot—1 novel
 Kamil Kozakowski—1 novel
 Konrad Kuśmirak—1 novel
 Grzegorz Szmatuła—1 novel

External links
 Official site
 Polish Pan Samochodzik Fandom Site
 About Pan Samochodzik
 Fanclub site
 Slovak site

Fictional amateur detectives
Fictional historians
Fictional Polish people
Fictional reporters
Characters in mystery novel series
Characters in novels of the 20th century
Pan Samochodzik